Pakistan competed at the 2022 Winter Olympics in Beijing, China, from 4 to 20 February 2022.

Pakistan's delegation consisted of one male alpine skier, who was accompanied by his coach and two officials.

Muhammad Karim was the country's flagbearer during the opening and closing ceremonies

Competitors
The following is the list of number of competitors participating at the Games per sport/discipline.

Alpine skiing

By meeting the basic qualification standards, Pakistan qualified one male and one female alpine skier. Mia Nuriah Freudweiler was the female skier but had to withdraw due to injury so only the male quota was accepted. Muhammad Karim competed in his third consecutive Winter Olympics.

See also
Pakistan at the 2022 Commonwealth Games

References

Nations at the 2022 Winter Olympics
2022
Winter Olympics